Anatoma is a genus of minute marine gastropod molluscs or micromolluscs in the family Anatomidae, found in Europe, Australia and New Zealand.

Description
This genus is characterized by a slit in the margin of the outer lip, a rhipidoglossate radula, and a lack of nacre.

Species
The genus Anatoma includes the following species:

Anatoma aedonia (Watson, 1886)
Anatoma africana (Barnard, 1963)
Anatoma agulhasensis (Thiele, 1925)
Anatoma alta (Watson, 1886)
Anatoma alternatisculpta Geiger & McLean, 2010
 Anatoma amoena (Thiele, 1912)
 Anatoma amydra Geiger & B.A. Marshall, 2012
 Anatoma argentinae (Zelaya & Geiger, 2007)
Anatoma aspera (Philippi, 1844)
Anatoma atlantica (Bandel, 1998)
Anatoma aupouria (Powell, 1937)
Anatoma australis (Hedley, 1903)
Anatoma austrolissa Geiger & Sasaki, 2008
 Anatoma bathypacifica (Geiger & McLean, 2010)
 Anatoma biconica Geiger, 2012
Anatoma boucheti Geiger & Sasaki, 2008
 Anatoma breveprima Geiger, 2012
 Anatoma brychia Pimenta & Geiger, 2015
 Anatoma campense Pimenta & Geiger, 2015
Anatoma concinna A. Adams, 1862
Anatoma conica (d'Orbigny, 1841)
 Anatoma copiosa Pimenta & Geiger, 2015
 Anatoma corralae Serge GOFAS, Ángel A. LUQUE, Joan Daniel OLIVER, José TEMPLADO & Alberto SERRA (2021), 2021 
Anatoma crispata (Fleming, 1828)
Anatoma disciformis (Golikov & Sirenko, 1980)
Anatoma emilioi Geiger, 2011
Anatoma equatoria (Hedley, 1899)
 Anatoma espiritosantense Pimenta & Geiger, 2015
Anatoma euglypta (Pelseneer, 1903)
 Anatoma eximia (Seguenza, 1877)
Anatoma finlayi (Powell, 1937)
 Anatoma flemingi (B.A. Marshall, 2002)
Anatoma flexidentata Geiger & Sasaki, 2008
 Anatoma fujikurai Sasaki, Geiger & Okutani 2010
 Anatoma georgii Geiger, 2017
 † Anatoma gephrya Maxwell, 1992 
 Anatoma globulus Geiger, 2012
 Anatoma gunteri (Cotton & Godfrey, 1933)
 Anatoma hyposculpta Geiger, 2012
Anatoma indonesica Bandel, 1998
Anatoma janetae Geiger, 2006
 Anatoma janusa Geiger, 2012
Anatoma japonica (A. Adams, 1862)
Anatoma keenae (McLean, 1970)
 Anatoma kelseyi (Dall, 1905)
 Anatoma kopua Geiger & B.A. Marshall, 2012
Anatoma lamellata (A. Adams, 1862)
Anatoma lyra (S. S. Berry, 1947)
Anatoma maxima (Schepman, 1908)
 Anatoma megascutula Geiger & B.A. Marshall, 2012
 Anatoma micalii Geiger, 2012
 † Anatoma miocenica (Laws, 1939) 
Anatoma munieri (P. Fischer, 1862)
 Anatoma orbiculata Geiger, 2012
Anatoma parageia Geiger & Sasaki, 2009
 Anatoma peruviana (Geiger & McLean, 2010)
Anatoma philippinica (Bandel, 1998)
 Anatoma planapex Geiger, 2012
Anatoma plicatazona Geiger & McLean, 2010
 Anatoma porcellana Geiger, 2012
Anatoma proxima (Dall, 1927)
 Anatoma pseudoequatoria (Kay, 1979)
 Anatoma quadraxialis Geiger, 2012
Anatoma rainesi Geiger, 2003
Anatoma rapaensis Geiger, 2008
 † Anatoma redoniana Landau, Van Dingenen & Ceulemans, 2017 
Anatoma regia (Mestayer, 1916)
 Anatoma rhynchodentata Geiger, 2012
Anatoma rolani Geiger & Fernández-Garcés, 2010
 Anatoma sagamiana (Okutani, 1964)
 Anatoma schanderi Høisæter & Geiger, 2011
 Anatoma schioettei Høisæter & Geiger, 2011
Anatoma shiraseae Numanami & Okutani, 1990
 Anatoma sinuosa Geiger, 2012
Anatoma soyoae (Habe, 1951)
Anatoma tabulata (Barnard, 1964)
 Anatoma tangaroa Geiger & B.A. Marshall, 2012
Anatoma tenuis (Jeffreys, 1877)
 Anatoma tenuisculpta (Seguenza, 1877)
Anatoma tobeyoides Geiger & Jansen, 2004
Anatoma umbilicata (Jeffreys, 1883)
 Anatoma weddelliana (Zelaya & Geiger, 2007)
Anatoma yaroni Herbert, 1986
 Anatoma zancliformis Geiger, 2012

Synonyms include:
Anatoma aequatorina Hedley, 1899: synonym of Anatoma equatoria (Hedley, 1899)
Anatoma aetheria (Melvill & Standen, 1903): synonym of Anatoma japonica (A. Adams, 1862)
Anatoma americana Bandel, 1998: synonym of Anatoma proxima (Dall, 1927)
Anatoma baxteri McLean, 1984: synonym of Thieleella baxteri (McLean, 1984)
Anatoma cebuana Bandel, 1998: synonym of Scissurella cebuana (Bandel, 1998)
Anatoma chiricova (Dall, 1919): synonym of Anatoma kelseyi (Dall, 1905)
 † Anatoma costamagnaensis Bandel, 1998: synonym of Anatoma aspera (Philippi, 1844)
Anatoma dohrniana Dunker, 1861: synonym of Scissurella dohrniana (Dunker, 1861)
Anatoma epicharis (McLean, 1970): synonym of Anatoma keenae (McLean, 1970)
Anatoma exquisita (Schepman, 1908): synonym of Anatoma japonica (A. Adams, 1862)
Anatoma funiculata Geiger & Jansen, 2004: synonym of  Anatoma pseudoequatoria (Kay, 1979)
Anatoma herberti Geiger & Sasaki, 2008: synonym of Anatoma finlayi (Powell, 1937)
Anatoma jacksoni (Melvill, 1904): synonym of Anatoma munieri (P. Fischer, 1862)
Anatoma jansenae Geiger, 2006: synonym of Anatoma japonica (A. Adams, 1862)
Anatoma josephinae (Odhner, 1960): synonym of Anatoma tenuis (Jeffreys, 1877)
Anatoma mantelli (Woodward, 1859): synonym of  Scissurella mantelli Woodward, 1859
Anatoma mirifica A. Adams, 1862: synonym of Scissurella mirifica (A. Adams, 1862)
Anatoma obtusata (Golikov & Gulbin, 1978): synonym of Anatoma concinna (A. Adams, 1862)
Anatoma paucispiralia (Bandel, 1998): synonym of Anatoma pseudoequatoria (Kay, 1979)
Anatoma pulchella (Bandel, 1998): synonym of Anatoma pseudoequatoria (Kay, 1979)
Anatoma richardi (Dautzenberg & H. Fischer, 1896): synonym of Scissurella richardi Dautzenberg & H. Fischer, 1896
Anatoma staminea A. Adams, 1862: synonym of Scissurella staminea (A. Adams, 1862)
Anatoma turbinata A. Adams, 1862: synonym of Anatoma munieri (P. Fischer, 1862)

Nomen dubium
 Anatoma bertheloti (d'Orbigny, 1840)

References

 Woodward S. P. (1859). On a new species of mollusk of the genus Scissurella D'Orbigny. Proceedings of the Zoological Society of London 27 (392-405): 202-204
 Høisæter T. & Geiger D.L. (2011) Species of Anatoma (Gastropoda: Anatomidae) in Norwegian and adjacent waters, with the description of two new species. The Nautilus 125(3): 89-112.

Further reading 

 Geiger D.L. (2012) Monograph of the little slit shells. Volume 1. Introduction, Scissurellidae. pp. 1-728. Volume 2. Anatomidae, Larocheidae, Depressizonidae, Sutilizonidae, Temnocinclidae. pp. 729-1291. Santa Barbara Museum of Natural History Monographs Number 7.

Anatomidae